The Asian Institute of Technology Ground is a University ground in Bangkok, Thailand. The ground is owned by the Asian Institute of Technology (AIT). The AIT field is one of the three cricket fields in Thailand where Thailand Cricket League matches are played. The AIT Cricket Team has also won the Bangkok Cricket League 'A' Division two times during the past three years.

It also boasts of a 9-hole golf course and a swimming pool. The self-contained campus also offers facilities including badminton, takraw, table tennis, tennis, basketball, cricket, volleyball and swimming.

In 2015, the Asian Institute of Technology Ground was named one of the host of Women's World Twenty20 Qualifier along with Thailand Cricket Ground.

See also

 Asian Institute of Technology 
 2015 ICC Women's World Twenty20 Qualifier
 Terdthai Cricket Ground

References

External links
 cricketarchive
 Cricinfo

Asian Institute of Technology
Cricket grounds in Thailand
Sports venues in Pathum Thani Province
2006 establishments in Thailand